Hi-Fi in Focus is the eighth studio album recorded by American guitarist Chet Atkins, released in 1957.

In the same year, "The Rhythm Rockers (featuring Chet Atkins)" released a single of "Tricky"/"Peanut Vendor". It did not chart. An EP was also released with Myrna Lorre on the flip side.

Reception

Allmusic music critic Richard S. Ginell praised the album and wrote "...suffice it to say that this is another lovingly played collection of a dozen tunes from what is now considered the great guitarist's most prized period on recordings."

Reissues
 In 2007, Hi-Fi in Focus was reissued on CD with bonus tracks as Hi-Fi in Focus Plus on the Universe label.

Track listing

Side one
 "El Cumbanchero" (Rafael Hernández) – 2:01
 "Ain't Misbehavin''" (Harry Brooks, Andy Razaf, Fats Waller) – 2:17
 "Shadow Waltz" (Al Dubin, Harry Warren) – 2:23
 "Anna (El Negro Zumbón)" (Roman Vatro, Franco Giordano) – 2:02
 "Yesterdays" (Otto Harbach, Jerome Kern) – 2:18
 "Portuguese Washerwoman" (Roger Lucchesi, André Popp) – 2:05

Side two
 "Tiger Rag" (Harry DaCosta, Eddie Edwards, Nick LaRocca, Larry Shields, Harry Regas, Tony Sbarbaro) – 1:49
 "Walk, Don't Run" (Johnny Smith) – 2:22
 "Tara's Theme" (David, Max Steiner) – 2:24
 "Johnson Rag" (Guy Hall, Henry Kleinkauf, Jack Lawrence) – 2:07
 "Lullaby of the Leaves" (Bernice Petkere, Joe Young) – 2:37
 "Bouree" (J.S. Bach) – 1:28
 "Avorada (Little Music Box)" (Traditional) – 1:30

Additional tracks on the 50th Anniversary release Hi-Fi in Focus... Plus:
 "Hidden Charm" (Rich) – 2:30
 "Tricky" (Jenkins) – 2:40
 "Martinique" (DeParis) – 2:37
 "Dig These Blues" (Chatmon, Greene) – 2:24
 "Colonial Ballroom" (Atkins, Thompson) – 2:26
 "August Moon" (Bradley, Cunow) – 2:37
 "The Red Leaves Of Autumn" (O'Connell) – 2:17
 "Its About Time" (Hoff) – 2:27
 "Dont Tease My Heart" (Allan, Stoalting) – 2:27
 "Fascinating Melody" (O'Connell) – 2:49
 "Saw Mill River Road" (O'Connell) – 2:39
 "Delightful Interlude" (O'Connell) – 2:33
 "Head Over Heels" (Stone) – 2:43
 "I Must Be Losing My Heart" (Sterling) – 2:10
 "I Wont Cry Anymore" (Allan, Miller) – 2:00
 "When Its Cherry Blossom Time" (Bradley) – 2:03

Personnel
Chet Atkins – guitar, vocals

References

1957 albums
Chet Atkins albums
RCA Victor albums